Israel Thompson Hatch (June 30, 1808 – September 24, 1875) was an American lawyer and politician who served one term as a U.S. Representative from New York from 1857 to 1859.

Biography
He was born in Johnstown, New York on June 30, 1808. Hatch pursued preparatory studies. He was graduated from Union College, Schenectady, New York, in 1829.
He studied law.
He was admitted to the bar in 1828.
He moved to Buffalo the same year and practiced law.
He served as assistant secretary of state 1829–1831.
Practiced law in Buffalo 1831–1840.
He served as member of the State assembly 1833, 1834, and 1851.
Surrogate of Erie County 1833–1836.
He served as president of the Commercial Bank of Buffalo 1840–1842.
Grain merchant.

Tenure in Congress 
Hatch was elected as a Democrat to the Thirty-fifth Congress (March 4, 1857 – March 3, 1859).
He served as chairman of the Committee on Militia (Thirty-fifth Congress).
He was an unsuccessful candidate for reelection in 1858 to the Thirty-sixth Congress.

Later career and death 
He was appointed by President Buchanan as postmaster of Buffalo, New York, and served from November 11, 1859, to March 27, 1861.
He resumed the practice of law.
He also engaged in banking and was prominently connected with elevator and dock enterprises.
He served as member of the State constitutional convention 1867–1868.
He served as commissioner to negotiate a reciprocity treaty between the United States and the Dominion of Canada in 1869 and 1870.
Built the Marine and Empire elevators in Buffalo.

He died in Buffalo, New York, September 24, 1875.
He was interred in Forest Lawn Cemetery.

Gov. Enos T. Throop was his half-brother, being a son of Hatch's mother of her first marriage.

References

1808 births
1875 deaths
Burials at Forest Lawn Cemetery (Buffalo)
Union College (New York) alumni
Democratic Party members of the United States House of Representatives from New York (state)
New York (state) postmasters
Politicians from Buffalo, New York
19th-century American politicians